Dr.Abbas Ekrami is a former Iranian football manager. He was the founder of one of Iran's most prestigious football clubs, Shahin.

References

External links 
History of Shahin FC

Iranian football managers